Pelham High School may refer to:
 Pelham High School (Alabama), a school in Pelham, Alabama, United States
 Pelham High School (Georgia), a school in Pelham, Georgia, United States
 Pelham High School (New Hampshire), a school in Pelham, New Hampshire, United States

See also
 Pelham Memorial High School, a school in Pelham, New York, United States